The Miss Indiana's Teen competition is the pageant that selects the representative for the U.S. state of Indiana in the Miss America's Teen pageant. 
Kayla Patterson of Farmland was crowned Miss Indiana's Outstanding Teen on June 18, 2022 at the Zionsville Performing Arts Center in Zionsville, Indiana. She competed for the title of Miss America's Outstanding Teen 2023 at the Hyatt Regency Dallas in Dallas, Texas on August 12, 2022.

In January of 2023, the official name of the pageant was changed from Miss Indiana’s Outstanding Teen, to Miss Indiana’s Teen, in accordance with the national pageant.

Results summary
The following is a visual summary of the past results of Miss Indiana's Outstanding Teen titleholders presented in the table below. The year in parentheses indicates year of the Miss America's Outstanding Teen competition in which the placement and/or award was garnered.

Placements 
 2nd runners-up: Audrey Ferguson (2016)
 Top 10: Sarah Gorecki (2006), Morgan Jackson (2008), Lydia Daley (2010), Katelyn Marak (2011)
 Top 12: Ellie Barmes (2018)
 Top 15: Hadley Abram (2020)

Awards

Preliminary awards 
 Preliminary Talent: Lydia Daley (2010)

Other awards 

 Teens in Action Finalist: Kate Dimmett (2022)

Winners

References

External links
 Official website

Indiana
Indiana culture
Women in Indiana
Annual events in Indiana